

Season 
In 2011–12, Novara spent his first season since 1955 in top flight: the team finished at 19th place, behind Lecce and ahead Cesena, being relegated in Serie B. In the whole league Novara won just seven games, achieving a double over Inter: 3–1 in Piola Stadium, 0–1 in San Siro.

Squad 
Squad at the end of season.

Goalkeepers 
 Achille Coser
 Alberto Maria Fontana
 Samir Ujkani

Defenders 
 Matteo Centurioni
 Alberto Cossentino
 Jean-Christophe Coubronne
 Paolo Hernán Dellafiore
 Santiago García
 Giuseppe Gemiti
 Andrea Lisuzzo
 Carlalberto Ludi
 Carlos Labrín
 Michel Morganella
 Massimo Paci
 Gabriel Silva

Midfielders 
 Daniel Jensen
 Francesco Marianini
 Andrea Mazzarani
 Simone Pesce
 Filippo Porcari
 Ivan Radovanović
 Marco Rigoni

Attackers 
 Andrea Caracciolo
 Jeda
 Giuseppe Mascara
 Takayuki Morimoto
 Raffaele Rubino

Manager 
 Attilio Tesser
 Emiliano Mondonico

League summary 

Updated to 13 May 2012.

References

Sources 

Novara F.C. seasons
Novara